John Cai Tiyuan (25 December 1920 - 24 November 1997) was a Chinese Catholic priest and Bishop of the Roman Catholic Diocese of Shantou between 1981 and 2000.

Biography
Cai was born into a Catholic family in Jiexi County, Guangdong, China, on December 25, 1920. In 1936 he was accepted to Jieyang Petrus Monastery. He was ordained a priest in February 1949. In 1981, he became the first priest to be elected by the Catholic Patriotic Association after the Cultural Revolution. In 1986, he was elected as one of two vice presidents for the government-approved Catholic Diocese Conference affiliated with the Chinese Catholic Patriotic Association. He eventually became the leader of the conference's liturgical commission. Cai celebrated his first Chinese Mass in February 1993. In July of the following year, he was elected President of the Guangdong Provincial Patriotic Association. He also became a member of the 7th National People's Congress in 1988, and was re-elected in 1993. He died on November 24, 1997.

References

1920 births
1997 deaths
People from Jiexi County
20th-century Roman Catholic bishops in China
Bishops of the Catholic Patriotic Association